Sirinat National Park is a national park in Phuket Province, Thailand. This park, with sections on land and sea, is in the northwest of the island of Phuket.

Geography

The park includes four main beaches: Hat Nai Thon, Hat Nai Yang, Hat Mai Khao, and Hat Sai Kaeo. Hat Mai Khao is Phuket's longest beach.

History
The park was originally known as Nai Yang National Park and became Thailand's 32nd national park on 13 July 1981. It was renamed Sirinat National Park in 1992.

A 2014 Bangkok Post editorial said that, "The latest questionable development in the sad saga of Sirinat National Park in Phuket province raises serious and vexing issues. Among the most pertinent is the old paradox of "Who will watch the watchers?" The Royal Thai Navy has moved into the precious park on the pretext of providing security. But the threats to this little jewel of national land are not physical, and heavily armed military men provide no solution at all".

In January 2016, it was reported that about 1,200 rai of Sirinat Park land was "detached" from the park by unscrupulous officials and sold to property developers, completed with illegal deeds, for 40 million baht per rai or approximately 50 billion baht in total. "The land had been detached from the national park so investers [sic] could build resorts and several well-known hotels,...", according to Mr Damrong Phidet, a former director-general of the National Parks, Wildlife and Plants Conservation Department.

Attractions
Sirinat National Park is best known for its well-preserved white sand beaches. Also, Hat Mai Khao and Hat Nai Yang are both sea turtle nesting areas. Between November and February sea turtles come to lay eggs on these beaches.

Flora and fauna
Tree species include common ironwood, tulip tree, tropical almond, white barringtonia, cajeput tree, Alexandrian laurel, screwpine, ashoka tree, black plum, elephant apple and morning glory.

Beach forest birds include magpie-robin, common myna, spotted dove, Asian fairy-bluebird, oriole, greater racket-tailed drongo and some bulbul species.

Sirinat National Park also hosts a small area (1 square kilometre) of mangrove forest, located where freshwater and seawater mix in estuarine areas. Tree species here include red mangrove, white mangrove, black mangrove, cannonball mangrove, looking-glass mangrove and Ceriops. Other plant species include Rhizophora apiculata and Derris trifoliata.

Mangrove forest birds include collared kingfisher, Terek sandpiper, bar-tailed godwit, white-breasted waterhen, slaty-breasted rail, white-bellied sea eagle, brahminy kite and large-billed crow.

The mangrove forest hosts some reptiles such as monitor lizard, mangrove snake and turtle.

Mangrove marine life includes shrimp, mudskipper, mullet, grouper and garfish.

Reef species include plate coral, soft coral, sea fan and sea anemone.

Formerly, leatherback sea turtles laid eggs on a stretch of beach in Sirinat National Park. At the park, 166 eggs were laid between 1999–2013, but the survival rate was small given the intensive property development along the beach. Since 2013 no further eggs have been observed there. Thailand was once a sanctuary for leatherback turtles.

See also
List of national parks of Thailand
List of Protected Areas Regional Offices of Thailand

References

National parks of Thailand
Geography of Phuket province
Tourist attractions in Phuket province
1981 establishments in Thailand
Protected areas established in 1981